The following is a list of the 59 municipalities (comuni) of the Province of Perugia, Umbria, Italy.

List

See also
List of municipalities of Italy

References

Perugia
 
Municipalities of the Province of Perugia